Project: Mersh is the final extended play, or EP release from the American punk rock trio Minutemen. It is their penultimate release, before D. Boon's death later that year in an auto accident.

Background
The cover art is a painting by D. Boon depicting a meeting of three exhausted record label executives in which one of them says "I got it! We'll have them write hit songs!" Project: Mersh was a sarcastic and ironic attempt at a commercial (or "mersh") recording rather than their "econo" method. Though, as bassist Mike Watt pointed out in a 1985 Bard College interview, "It's only mersh because we said it was mersh, it only sold about half as much as our art record Double Nickels on the Dime." All six songs surpass the two-minute mark ("More Spiel" is nearly six minutes long) and incorporate verses, choruses, hooks, and fade outs, in contrast to nearly all the band's previous recordings. Crane, who provided backing vocals and played the trumpet on Buzz or Howl Under the Influence of Heat, returned to lend his voice and instrumentals to the album. The album even utilizes a synthesizer, which was played by Ethan James who produced their previous album Double Nickels on the Dime.
The album also features a cover of Steppenwolf's "Hey Lawdy Mama."

Track listing
Side one
"The Cheerleaders" (D. Boon) – 3:52
"King of the Hill" (Boon) – 3:24
"Hey Lawdy Mama" – 3:37 (Larry Byrom, Jerry Edmonton & John Kay of Steppenwolf)

Side two
"Take Our Test" (Mike Watt) – 2:44
"Tour-Spiel" (Watt) – 2:45
"More Spiel" (Watt) – 5:52

Personnel
The Minutemen
D. Boon – guitar, singing
George Hurley – drums, sound effects, wood block
Mike Watt – bass guitar, backing vocals, acoustic guitar, speech

Additional musicians
Crane – trumpet, backing vocals
Ethan James – synthesizer, backing vocals

Charts

References

1985 EPs
Minutemen (band) albums
SST Records EPs
Concept albums